James R. Durham (February 7, 1833 – August 6, 1904) was a Union Army officer during the American Civil War. He received the Medal of Honor for gallantry during the Second Battle of Winchester, Virginia on June 14, 1863.

Medal of Honor citation
"The President of the United States of America, in the name of Congress, takes pleasure in presenting the Medal of Honor to Second Lieutenant James R. Durham, United States Army, for extraordinary heroism on 14 June 1863, while serving with Company E, 12th West Virginia Infantry, in action at Winchester, Virginia. Second Lieutenant Durham led his command over the stone wall, where he was wounded."

See also

List of Medal of Honor recipients for the Battle of Gettysburg
List of American Civil War Medal of Honor recipients: A–F

References

External links
 Military Times Hall of Valor
 

1833 births
1904 deaths
Military personnel from Richmond, Virginia
People of Virginia in the American Civil War
People of West Virginia in the American Civil War
Union Army officers
United States Army Medal of Honor recipients
Burials at Arlington National Cemetery
American Civil War recipients of the Medal of Honor